Apartmenti 2XL was an Albanian non-scripted sketch comedy television sitcom created and produced by Turjan Hysko which premiered every Tuesday at 21:00 on Vizion Plus.

Format 
Apartment 2XL is a TV format where the actors have no script and the only thing they know is the starting point and the story.

Series overview

Cast 
 Julian Deda 
 Albano Bogdo
 Esmeralda Metka 
 Visjan Ukcenaj 
 Andrea Vreto
 Eliona Pitarka 
 Eglein Laknori

Past members
 Ermal Mamaqi
 Gentian Zenelaj
 Lisa Kujofsa
 Erblin Bajko
 Irgen Çela
 Xheni Hallulli
 Ina Gjonçi
 Petrina Çako
 Erand Sojli
 Egzona Ademi
 Oriana Cama

References

External links 
 

Albanian television shows
2010s Albanian television series
Vizion Plus original programming